Cavalcade of Heroes is a 1950 Italian historical melodrama film directed by Mario Costa and starring Cesare Danova, Carla Del Poggio and Vittorio Sanipoli. It depicts the events around the founding of the short-lived Roman Republic of 1849.

Plot 
Love story of a patriot and a girl with a noble lineage, already linked to a Frenchman, against the backdrop of the second assault of the French troops in Rome which took place between June 3 and July 2, 1849. With the French entry and victory, who install a provisional government, the two lovers will decide, once the differences of a social nature have been overcome, to follow Garibaldi's troops in Northern Italy.

Partial cast
Cesare Danova as Massimo Ruffo
 Carla Del Poggio as Giulia Fabbri
 Vittorio Sanipoli as Ottavio Monis
 Otello Toso as Angelo Masina
 Camillo Pilotto as Alessandro Fabbri
 Paola Borboni as La marchesa Ferrari
 Alfredo Varelli as Luciano Manara
 Carlo Tamberlani as Pisacane
 Ugo Sasso as Giuseppe Garibaldi
 Germana Paolieri as La duchessa
 Carlo Romano as Paolo Tassoni
 Marco Vicario as Mario
 Ave Ninchi as Aurelia
 Attilio Dottesio as Mazzini
 Mario Ferrari as Generale Odivot
 Dante Maggio as Ciccillo
 Arturo Dominici as Generale Gilletti
 Peppino Spadaro as Capitan Turi
 Achille Majeroni as Il vescovo

References

Bibliography
 Moliterno, Gino. Historical Dictionary of Italian Cinema. Scarecrow Press, 2008.

External links

1950 films
Italian historical drama films
1950s historical drama films
Italian black-and-white films
1950s Italian-language films
Films set in Rome
Films set in 1849
Cultural depictions of Giuseppe Garibaldi
1950 drama films
Films scored by Alessandro Cicognini
Films directed by Mario Costa
1950s Italian films